Michael James Porter (born 21 April 1995) is an English cricketer. Porter is a right-handed batsman who bowls right-arm Leg breaks. He was born in Poole, Dorset.

Porter made his debut for Hampshire in a List A fixture against Sri Lanka A at the Ageas Bowl in 2014. The match though was abandoned after 18 overs due to rain with Porter not having batted or bowled.

Porter has also played for Dorset and was 12th man for the 3rd test between England and India during India's tour of England at the Ageas Bowl. England won this match by 266 runs.

References

External list
Michael Porter at ESPNcricinfo
Michael Porter at CricketArchive

1995 births
Living people
Cricketers from Poole
English cricketers
Hampshire cricketers
Dorset cricketers